Dominik Patryk Steczyk (born 4 May 1999) is a Polish professional footballer who plays as a forward for 3. Liga club Hallescher FC.

References

External links
Dominik Steczyk at 90minut

1999 births
Living people
Sportspeople from Katowice
Polish footballers
Poland youth international footballers
Association football forwards
1. FC Nürnberg II players
Piast Gliwice players
Stal Mielec players
Hallescher FC players
Regionalliga players
3. Liga players
Ekstraklasa players
Polish expatriate footballers
Expatriate footballers in Germany
Polish expatriate sportspeople in Germany